The Rudolph Grotto Gardens is a religious site in Rudolph, Wisconsin. It features ornamental and devotional artificial grottoes, including the Wonder Cave, an above-ground tunnel constructed of vernacular stone in the twentieth century by Father Philip Wagner and Edmund Rybicki. The site contains twenty-six shrines and is covered with gardens and paths. The Father Wagner Memorial Museum is also on the site.

Gardens
The Grotto Gardens are 7.5 acres of land containing a number large number of plants, notably hostas as well as religious shrines including the stations of the cross. A 78-ton rock was excavated by volunteers and raised to ground level by the local government to form part of a patriotic memorial at the site.

References

External links
Rudolph Grotto Gardens

Landforms of Wood County, Wisconsin
Tourist attractions in Wood County, Wisconsin